Coenipeta bibitrix is a genus of moths in the family Erebidae. The species is found from southern Florida and southern Texas, south to northern South America.

The wingspan is about 30 mm.

References

Moths described in 1823
Omopterini
Moths of North America
Moths of South America